McMillin is a census-designated place located in Pierce County, Washington.

Demographics
In 2010, it had a population of 1,547 inhabitants. 685 are male. 862 are female.

References

Census-designated places in Pierce County, Washington